Samuel Hale  (July 1, 1615 – November 9, 1693) was a founding settler of Hartford and Norwalk, Connecticut. He was a deputy of the General Court of the Colony of Connecticut from Norwalk in the sessions of 1656, 1657 and 1660.

He was born on July 1, 1615 in Watton-on-Stone, Hertford, England, the son of John Hale and Martha MNU. He likely immigrated with his brother Thomas Hale and sister Martha. Martha married Paul Peck Sr, before 1638, who was also a Hartford founder.

One validation of these siblings comes from the medical journal of Governor John Winthrop, who was also a physician: 
“25 Mar 1666 • Hartford, Connecticut treated: 
Peck, Martha: 45 y. wife of Paule, .... wormes & paine in back & other  wch thinks is wind 2 dos 5g N. N. & 8g to take after. She is sis of Sam: Hale of Wethersfield & hath a bro Tho: Hale at Charleston. Sent word it wrought well, but very sick before it wrought.”

Samuel Hale was living in Hartford in 1639.

He was a selectman in Wethersfield in 1647.

He served in the Pequot War, with his brother Thomas, for which he received a lot in the Soldiers' Field.

He moved to Norwalk before 1655 with his brother Thomas.

He served as a deputy in the General Court of the Connecticut Colony representing Norwalk in 1656, 1657, 1658, and 1660.

In 1660, he moved back to Wethersfield.

He is listed on the Founders Stone bearing the names of the founders of Hartford in the Ancient Burying Ground in Hartford, and he is also listed on the Founders Stone bearing the names of the founders of Norwalk in the East Norwalk Historical Cemetery.

References 

1615 births
1693 deaths
American Puritans
Connecticut city council members
Deputies of the Connecticut General Court (1639–1662)
Founders of Hartford, Connecticut
People from Hertford
People from Wethersfield, Connecticut
Pequot War
Founding settlers of Norwalk, Connecticut